Trahern's Station was a stage stand on the old Butterfield Overland Mail route in Indian Territory. It was located about 9 miles west of what is now the town of Shadypoint in Le Flore County, Oklahoma.  The station was named for Judge James N. Trahern, the stage agent. Trahern was a Choctaw Indian and a long-time county judge for Skullyville County, Choctaw Nation.

Trahern's Station was added to the National Register of Historic Places (#72001073) on April 25, 1972.

References

Buildings and structures in Le Flore County, Oklahoma
Stagecoach stations in Oklahoma
Butterfield Overland Mail in Indian Territory
Stagecoach stations on the National Register of Historic Places